Barišić is a Croatian surname. According to 2011 census results, it is one of 10 most frequent surnames in Brod-Posavina and Šibenik-Knin County of Croatia. People with the surname include:

 Adrian Leon Barišić (born 2001), Bosnian footballer
 Andrew Barisic (born 1986), Australian footballer
 Bartol Barišić (born 2003), Croatian footballer
 Borna Barišić (born 1992), Croatian football player
 Dragana Barišić (born 1975), Serbian politician
 Hrvoje Barišić (born 1991), Croatian footballer
 Marko Barišić (born 1993), Croatian football player
 Josip Barišić (footballer born 1981), Croatian football player
 Josip Barišić (footballer born 1983), Bosnian Croat football player
 Josip Barišić (born 1986), Croatian footballer
 Maks Barišič (born 1995), Slovenian footballer 
 Marin Barišić (born 1947), Croatian archbishop
 Mirko Barišić (born 1936), Croatian sportsman, businessman and entrepreneur
 Pavo Barišić (born 1959), Croatian philosopher and politician
 Rafael Barišić (1796-1863), Croatian Catholic bishop
 Tomislav Barišić (born 1993), Bosnian footballer
 Valentin Barišić (born 1966), Croatian football manager
 Zoran Barisic (born 1970), Austrian football player and manager

References

Croatian surnames
Patronymic surnames